Timbersbrook is a small village in the town parish of Congleton, Cheshire, England.

References

Villages in Cheshire